Ron Justice is a Republican state senator from the U.S. state of Oklahoma. Justice serves District 23 of the Oklahoma State Senate. Justice is also a retired Oklahoma State University (OSU) County Extension Agent. He currently resides in Chickasha, Oklahoma.  Justice has bachelor's and master's degrees from OSU.

Political career
Ron Justice is a conservative pro-life Republican with a focus on rural issues. In 2009, he voted for a ban on embryonic stem cell research, voter identification reform legislation and tort reform legislation. He has served as a state Senator from 2004.

Notes

Living people
Republican Party Oklahoma state senators
Oklahoma State University alumni
Year of birth missing (living people)
21st-century American politicians